St Peter's Church, Harrogate is a parish church in the Church of England located in Harrogate.

History
The church was formed out of the parish of Christ Church, High Harrogate.
 
A subscription for the erection of the church was commenced and the foundation stone was laid in April, 1870. The church is of the decorated style of architecture, from a design by Mr. Hirst, of Bristol, and consists of a nave of five bays, 70 feet in length by 27 feet in breadth, with north and south aisles, each 15 feet 9 inches wide; the last bay at the eastern end of the aisle on each side projects outwards to double its former breadth, in the form of a transept, which is gabled outwardly; the chancel will be about 35 feet in length by 22 feet in breadth, terminating in a circular apse, the interior of which will be arcaded. A tower, bearing a spire, is situate at the west end of the south aisle.

The living is a curacy or vicarage, the income of which is £100 a year, paid by the Ecclesiastical Commissioners. The first incumbent - the Rev. L. F. W. Foote - appointed in 1870.

The chancel, with a temporary nave, was consecrated on Sunday 10 September 1871 by Reverend Bishop Ryan, vicar of Bradford.

List of Vicars
 Lundy Edward William Foote 1870 - 1922
 John Manstead Cunningham 1922 - 1937
 Gascoigne Cecil Clare 1937 - 1947 (formerly vicar of St Edmund's, Roundhay, Leeds)
 Roger Holford Baines 1947 - 1967
 Andrew Neville Burn Sugden 1967 - 1987
 Anthony Michael Shepherd 1987 - 2015
 Alan Garrow 2016–present

Organ
The church has a pipe organ which has evolved over a long period of time from an original organ by Edmund Schulze in 1867. This was moved to St Bartholomew's Church, Armley and a smaller organ installed in 1869. There have been restorations by Brindley & Foster, Abbott & Smith, Binns, J. W. Walker & Sons Ltd, and Prested.

A specification of the organ can be found on the National Pipe Organ Register.

List of organists

Miss Knowles
Alfred Robinson
Mr. Paley
John Septimus Dickinson 1870 - ???? (formerly organist of Christ Church, High Harrogate)
John Shaw 1879 - 1890
Robert Senior Burton 1890 - 1892 (formerly organist of Leeds Parish Church)
Charles Legh Naylor 1892 - 1902
John Pullein 1903  - 1917 (formerly assistant at Lincoln Cathedral, latterly organist of St Mary's Cathedral, Glasgow)
Charles Legh Naylor 1917 - 1935 (appointed again) 
Jack Spencer 1935 - 1970 (previously organist of St Stephen's Church, Kirkstall, Leeds)
J Harry Hodgson 1970 – 1976
Adrian Selway 1976 – 1981
Ian Linford 1980 – 1984
Ralph S Franklin 1984 – 1987
Hugh Shelton 1987 – 1988
Nigel Holdsworth 1988 – 1993
Philip Wilby 1993 – 1997
Richard Hunt 1997 – 2003
Oliver Longstaff 2003 – 2012
John Longstaff 2012 – present

Bells
St Peter's has a fine ring of eight bells in the tower which were cast by John Taylor of Loughborough. They achieved a certain notoriety when they became the first tower in the United Kingdom to have an injunction made on the bells for an offence of noise pollution.

References

Anglican Diocese of Leeds
Church of England church buildings in North Yorkshire
St Peter's